Yeh Hai Mumbai Meri Jaan is a Hindi-language comedy series that aired on Zee TV every Wednesday 7:30pm.The concept of this comedy draws greatly from the city of Mumbai - the melting pot of rural simplicity and urban complexity.

Overview
The story revolves around a simple man, Hariprasad, who comes to Mumbai from a village in Jaunpur to fulfill his dream of becoming a glamour photographer. He has worked very hard to shed his small-town image, anglicised his name from Hariprasad to Harry and hates talking about his past. He tries to act as if he is from a foreign country. The story takes a twist when Hariprasad learns that his cousin, Balkrishna (Balu) is also coming to Mumbai to become a movie star. Sadly, Balu also gets a job where Harry works. Seeing Harry pretend to be a city slicker, Balu tries to expose the truth about his rural origins whenever they are together.

Cast
Varun Badola as Balkrishna (Balu)
Sweta Keswani
Vrajesh Hirjee as Hariprasad (Harry)
Daisy Irani as Mrs. Desai

References

Official Site of Production House

Indian comedy television series
Zee TV original programming
2001 Indian television series debuts
2001 Indian television series endings
Television shows set in Mumbai